Robert Bédard may refer to:

Robert Bédard (tennis) (born 1931), Canadian tennis player
Robert Bédard (wrestler) (1932–2019), Canadian wrestler